Zinkwazi Beach is a small town on the North Coast of the KwaZulu-Natal province in South Africa. It is well known for its lagoon, which is an estuary of the Zinkwazi River.

References

Populated places in the KwaDukuza Local Municipality